Huaguruncho, Tarata or Huagaruncho is a  mountain in the Huaguruncho mountain range in the Andes of Peru. Its highest peak, officially named Tarata, is located in the Pasco Region, Pasco Province, on the border of the districts of Huachón and Ticlacayan. A minor peak, named Huaguruncho Chico by the IGN map, lies west of it in the Ticlacayan District.

Research revealed that fluctuations in Huaguruncho's glaciers were caused by temperature changes in the tropical Atlantic Ocean, with the last major glacial expansion occurring ca. 4000–2000 years ago.

References

Mountains of Peru
Mountains of Pasco Region